The women's 15 kilometre skiathlon competition in cross-country skiing at the 2022 Winter Olympics was held on 5 February, at the Kuyangshu Nordic Center and Biathlon Center in Taizicheng. The event was won by Therese Johaug of Norway. The event was noted for its extreme weather, which many athletes complained.

Summary
The 2018 champion, Charlotte Kalla, qualified for the Olympics and was competing in the race, finishing 18th, and the 2018 silver medalist, Marit Bjørgen, retired from competitions. The bronze medalist, Krista Pärmäkoski, qualified. The overall leader of the 2021–22 FIS Cross-Country World Cup before the Olympics was Natalya Nepryayeva, and the distance leader was Frida Karlsson. Therese Johaug is the 2021 World Champion.

20 minutes into the race, the leading group consisted of Johaug, Kerttu Niskanen and Karlsson, skiing together, with Parmakoski, Ebba Andersson, Teresa Stadlober and Nepryayeva a few seconds behind. Then Parmakoski passed Andersson, with Johaug still in the lead. At 27 minutes, Johaug was 15 seconds ahead of the competitors, with Karlsson second, and Parmakoski and Niskanen further 6 seconds behind. Johaug continued to increase the gap and when she was 30 seconds ahead of the competitors, Nepryayeva and Stadlober overtaken Niskanen and Parmakoski, catching up with Karlsson. Parmakoski could not keep up with the rest of the group. Johaug comfortably finished first, 30 seconds ahead of Nepryayeva who outskied Stadlober at the finish line.

Qualification

Results
The race started at 15:45.

References 

Women's cross-country skiing at the 2022 Winter Olympics